Playing With Fire is a lost 1921 American silent comedy film directed by Dallas M. Fitzgerald and starring Gladys Walton.

Plot
As described in a film magazine, Enid Gregory (Walton) works in a music store. She is a regular "jazz baby" who flirts with others while keeping company with Bill Butler (Gribbon), a plumber. She finds Janet Fenwick (McGuire), a young society woman whose father committed suicide under a cloud of disgrace, so Enid gets her employer Bruce Tilford (Mack) to hire Janet to sing the ballads that she plays. Business picks up and Tilford gives the two women two days of vacation. Enid and Janet go to a fashionable hotel where they meet several of Janet's former friends. Janet becomes engaged to an old sweetheart and Enid succumbs to the embrace of Kent Lloyd (Cooley), a wealthy young man, and allows him to slip a ring on her finger. In the last reel, they cope with the effects of a fire.

Cast
Gladys Walton as Enid Gregory
Kathryn McGuire as Janet Fenwick
Eddie Gribbon as Bill Butler
Hayward Mack as Bruce Tilford
Harold Miller as Jack Taylor
Hallam Cooley as Kent Lloyd
Sidney Franklin as Pat Isaacs
Lydia Knott as Miss Seraphina
Harriet Laurel as Maggie Turner
Elinor Hancock as Mrs. Taylor
Danny Hoy as Rats

References

External links

The AFI Catalog of Feature Films: Playing With Fire
Period lobby poster
 (incorrect review by Hal Erickson to this 1921 Universal film. The review he has is to the 1916 Olga Petrova film of the same name which has a review by Janiss Garza.)

1921 films
American silent feature films
Lost American films
Universal Pictures films
1921 comedy films
Silent American comedy films
American black-and-white films
Films directed by Dallas M. Fitzgerald
1921 lost films
Lost comedy films
1920s American films